Queen Margaret University RFC is a rugby union club based in Musselburgh, Scotland. The club operates a men's team and a women's team. Both currently play in the university leagues.

History

In May 2021, the women's side journeyed by foot from Musselburgh to Murrayfield Stadium in Edinburgh carrying a medical stretcher to raise funds for the Heads for Change charity; and to raise awareness of concussion in rugby union.

Sides

The men's side train at 6pm on Mondays & Wednesdays at Inch Park in Edinburgh.

The women's side train at 6.45pm to 8.15pm on Mondays at Inch Park.

Honours

Men

 Scottish Conference 4A
 Champions (1): 2010–11, 2018–19
 Scottish Conference 5A
 Champions (1): 2009–10, 2015–16

Notable former players

Women

Ireland

The following former Queen Margaret University RFC players have represented Ireland at senior international level.

References

Rugby union in East Lothian
Scottish rugby union teams
University and college rugby union clubs in Scotland